Albert is a 2016 American CGI Christmas-themed musical comedy  TV movie produced by Nickelodeon and distributed by Paramount Television. It premiered on December 9, 2016, and is Nickelodeon's first original animated TV movie.

Premise
Albert, a small Douglas fir tree, sets out on an adventure to become the most famous Christmas tree in his hometown.

Cast
 Bobby Moynihan as Albert, a small Douglas fir tree who wants to become the Empire City Christmas tree
 Sasheer Zamata as Maisie, a very positive corn plant, hence the name, and Albert's girlfriend
 Judah Friedlander as Gene, a weed and Albert's best friend who is disliked by everybody
 Cheri Oteri as Linda
 Rob Riggle as Cactus Pete/Roy, the main antagonist who loathes Christmas, because he is taken out of the spotlight of his restaurant for a month, and seeks revenge on Christmas trees.
 Tom Kenny as Horton
 Breanna Yde as Molly, a helpful young girl who believes that Albert can do big things.
 John DiMaggio as Donny, Molly's father.
 Mary Pat Gleason as Earth Mama, Molly's grandmother and the caretaker of Albert, Maisie and the rest of the plants.

Premiere
Albert premiered on Nickelodeon on December 9, 2016. It also premiered on Nicktoons the following day.

Home media
The television film was released on DVD in Region 1 on November 14, 2017 by Paramount Home Entertainment. It was then released on DVD in Region 2 on October 29, 2018 by Paramount Home Entertainment.

Book
Aaron and Will Eisenberg, the film's screenwriters, have written a book based on it, Albert: The Little Tree with Big Dreams, to anticipate the premiere of the film.

References

External links
 

2010s American animated films
2016 computer-animated films
2016 television films
2016 films
Nickelodeon animated films
Nickelodeon original films
Films set in Vermont
Films set in New York City
Christmas trees
2010s English-language films
Films directed by Max Lang